Beggar's lice is a common name for several species of plants and may refer to:

 Hackelia virginiana
 Species of the genus Desmodium
 Species of the genus Hylodesmum
 Hylodesmum glutinosum, native to North America
 Species of the genus Torilis
 Torilis arvensis, invasive in North America